Everything Dies is a single by American gothic metal band Type O Negative from their fall 1999 release World Coming Down. It was a successful single for the band making #37 on the Mainstream Rock Tracks.

Music video
A music video was filmed for the song, featuring the band and singer Peter Steele in various settings, as well as footage of a family having dinner with the members of the family slowly fading away. In the end of the music video, Peter Steele goes underwater, possibly drowning himself. Part of the video was filmed in a shipyard where Steele's father - who died a few years before the album was recorded - used to work.

Track listing

Charts

References

External links
 Type O Negative  Everything Dies  Official video YouTube

1999 singles
1999 songs
Type O Negative songs
Songs written by Peter Steele
Roadrunner Records singles